Hassan Jafari (born July 21, 1990, in Noor Abad) is an Iranian football midfielder who played for Mes Rafsanjan in the Persian Gulf Pro League.

Club career
Jafari Played his entire career for Sepahan except for two seasons at Malavan due to military services.

Club career statistics

Honours
Malavan
Hazfi Cup: 2010–11 (Runner-up)

Sepahan
Iran Pro League: 2011–12
Hazfi Cup: 2012–13

Foolad
Iran Pro League: 2013–14

References

External links
 

1990 births
Living people
Iranian footballers
Association football defenders
Persian Gulf Pro League players
Sepahan S.C. footballers
Malavan players
Nassaji Mazandaran players